ZW or zw may refer to:

 ZW sex-determination system, chromosomal in birds and some species of reptile, fish, and insect
 ZW, heterogametic female designation under this system
 Air Wisconsin (IATA airline designator), a US airline
 Zettawatt (ZW), an SI unit of power
 Zimbabwe (ISO 3166-1 alpha-2 country code ZW)
 .zw, the country code top level domain (ccTLD) for Zimbabwe
 Zulte-Waregem, Belgian association football club